Lewis Watson may refer to:

Lewis Watson (athlete) (1895–1961), American Olympic athlete
Lewis Watson (musician) (born 1992), English singer-songwriter
Lewis Watson, 1st Baron Rockingham (1584–1653), English landowner and politician
Lewis Watson, 1st Earl of Rockingham (1655–1724), English peer and politician
Lewis Watson, 2nd Earl of Rockingham (1714–1745), English peer and politician, grandson of the above
Lewis Watson, 1st Baron Sondes (1728–1795), British Member of Parliament for Kent
Lewis Watson, 2nd Baron Sondes (1754–1806), British Whig politician and peer
Lewis Watson, 3rd Baron Sondes (1792–1836), English peer
Lewis Findlay Watson (1819–1890), U.S. Representative from Pennsylvania

See also
 Louis H. Watson (1906–1936), American contract bridge player and writer
 Louis L. Watson (1895–?), American college football player and coach